The Master of International Studies (MIS) is an academic postgraduate degree that prepares students for careers in diplomacy, government service, inter-governmental organizations (IGOs), non-governmental organizations (NGOs), and multinational corporations (MNCs). It is designed to address the growing complexities of the international system, through interdisciplinary study.

Graduates of the MIS should be equipped with the skills to analyze and assess theoretical and thematic approaches to international studies in relation to issues of governance and conflict, globalization, migration and media, regional imperatives and priorities, and cultures and societies.

Universities around the world that offer the MIS include American University/Washington, D.C., the North Carolina State University, Stellenbosch University, Seoul National University (Graduate School of International Studies), the University of Queensland, the University of Sydney, the University of Otago, the George Washington University, Bjørknes College, the University of South Australia, the University of the Philippines Diliman, International Pacific College and the University of Melbourne, among others.

Further reading 
 International studies and global studies
 International relations and global affairs

Master's degrees